Yul Mark Du Pont (born 4 April 1971) is a Swazi swimmer. He competed in three events at the 1988 Summer Olympics.

References

1971 births
Living people
Swazi male swimmers
Olympic swimmers of Eswatini
Swimmers at the 1988 Summer Olympics
Commonwealth Games competitors for Eswatini
Swimmers at the 1986 Commonwealth Games
Place of birth missing (living people)